The 1934 United States Senate election in California was held on November 6, 1934. Incumbent Republican Senator Hiram Johnson was re-elected to his fourth term in office.

By cross-filing and winning the Democratic primary, Johnson eliminated his strongest competition and handily won the general election with only nominal opposition from the Socialist Party.

Republican primary

Candidates
 Hiram Johnson, incumbent Senator
 Richmond A. Rust

Results

Democratic primary

Candidates
 Clarence A. Henning, candidate for U.S. Representative in 1924
 Carl A. Johnson, nominee for California's 7th congressional district in 1902
 Hiram Johnson, incumbent Senator (cross-filing)

Results

Third parties and independents

Independent
A write-in bid was launched in support of Communist Pat Chambers.

Socialist
 George Ross Kirkpatrick, nominee for Vice President in 1916

General election

Results

See also 
  1934 United States Senate elections

References 

1934 California elections
California
1934